Yamile Fors Guerra (born 11 May 1977) is a Cuban retired female tennis player.

Fors Guerra won 1 singles titles and 10 doubles titles on the ITF tour. On 24 July 2006, she reached her best singles ranking of world number 733. On 24 July 2006, she peaked at world number 421 in the doubles rankings.

Playing for Cuba at the Fed Cup, Fors Guerra had a win–loss record of 46–33.

ITF finals (11–4)

Singles (1–1)

Doubles (10–3)

References

External links 
 
 
 

1977 births
Living people
Cuban female tennis players
Pan American Games medalists in tennis
Pan American Games bronze medalists for Cuba
Tennis players at the 2003 Pan American Games
Central American and Caribbean Games medalists in tennis
Central American and Caribbean Games silver medalists for Cuba
Central American and Caribbean Games bronze medalists for Cuba
Tennis players at the 2007 Pan American Games
Tennis players at the 2011 Pan American Games
Medalists at the 2003 Pan American Games
20th-century Cuban women
20th-century Cuban people
21st-century Cuban women